Jayne Marie Trcka (born April 16, 1963) is an American female bodybuilder, fitness model and actress.

Early life

She studied gymnastics and other sports in school. She started weight training after moving to Southern California in 1986.

Career
By 1988, she was competing in bodybuilding shows. In 1998, she quit her job with the postal service to focus on a fitness career and became a certified personal trainer.  She began her acting career in 2000 with Scary Movie. Today she continues to perform in bodybuilding shows and to pursue her acting career. Currently she is also a realtor working for Realty Source California.

Trcka won first place at the 1997 California State Championships at age 34, the 1998 Junior Nationals, and the 2004 Los Angeles. She has top ten finishes in more than twenty other competitions.

Trcka has appeared in numerous muscle/fitness magazines, including Flex, MuscleMag International, Women's Physique World, Iron Man, and Fighting Females.

Filmography

Films

Television

Music videos

References

External links

Actresses from Saint Paul, Minnesota
American film actresses
American female bodybuilders
Living people
1963 births
21st-century American women